Nikolaos Karabetakis (born 17 May 1971) is a retired Greek football goalkeeper and later manager.

References

1971 births
Living people
Greek footballers
Kavala F.C. players
A.P.O. Akratitos Ano Liosia players
Super League Greece players
Greek football managers
Doxa Drama F.C. managers
Agrotikos Asteras F.C. managers
GAS Ialysos 1948 F.C. managers
Apollon Paralimnio F.C. managers
Association football goalkeepers
Footballers from Kavala